James Martin Scott (June 11, 1938 – April 13, 2017) was an American politician and community affairs consultant. A Democrat, he was elected to the Virginia House of Delegates in November 1991 by a margin of a single vote, and served eleven terms, declining to seek re-election in 2013. He represented the city of Falls Church and part of Fairfax County, including Merrifield; since at least 2002, the district was numbered the 53rd.

Early and family life
Born in Galax, Virginia in 1938, Scott graduated from the University of North Carolina at Chapel Hill, North Carolina, receiving a  B.A. in 1960; and M.A. in 1965. Upon moving to northern Virginia to work for the Inova Health System, Scott attended graduate classes at George Mason University, and received a master's degree in public affairs in 1982. His charitable work included through his United Church of Christ church, the Fairfax Partnership for Youth (board of directors), AHOME (Affordable Housing Opportunities Means Everyone), and the Fairfax Fair.

Career
Scott worked as community affairs consultant for Inova Fairfax Hospital. He served, part-time, on the Fairfax County Board of Supervisors from 1972 to 1986. Other public service positions he held were on the Metropolitan Washington Council of Governments, Northern Virginia Planning District Commission, Northern Virginia Transportation Commission (former chairman), Virginia Association of Counties (former President), and the Washington Metropolitan Area Transit Authority.

In 2013 Scott announced that he would not run for reelection to the House of Delegates. He endorsed Marcus Simon, his former aide turned real estate lawyer, who was elected his successor.

Death
Jim Scott died on April 13, 2017 from complications of Alzheimer's disease. He was 78 years old.

References

External links

Project Vote Smart - Representative James Martin 'Jim' Scott (VA) profile
Follow the Money - James M. Scott
2005 2003 2001 1999 campaign contributions

1938 births
2017 deaths
Democratic Party members of the Virginia House of Delegates
United Church of Christ members
University of North Carolina at Chapel Hill alumni
George Mason University alumni
People from Fairfax County, Virginia
People from Galax, Virginia
Members of the Fairfax County Board of Supervisors
21st-century American politicians
Deaths from dementia in Virginia
Deaths from Alzheimer's disease
20th-century American politicians